Elder financial abuse is a type of elder abuse in which misappropriation of financial resources or abusive use of financial control, in the context of a relationship where there is an expectation of trust, causes harm to an older person.

The Older Americans Act of 2006 defines elder financial abuse, or financial exploitation, as “the fraudulent or otherwise illegal, unauthorized, or improper act or process of an individual, including a caregiver or fiduciary, that uses the resources of an older individual for monetary or personal benefit, profit, or gain, or that results in depriving an older individual of rightful access to, or use of, benefits, resources, belongings, or assets.”

Types

By family or caregivers

Family members and informal or paid caregivers have special access to seniors and thus are often in a position to inflict financial abuse through deception, coercion, misrepresentation, undue influence, or theft. Common abusive practices include:
 Money or property is used without the senior's permission or taken from them, for example removal from their home and then use of the home by the abuser, or depositing income such as pension or benefit checks
 The senior's signature is forged or identity is misappropriated for financial transactions
 The senior is coerced or influenced to sign over deeds or wills, or caused to execute legal documents they do not understand
 The abuser fraudulently obtains a power of attorney or guardianship
 Money is borrowed from the senior and never repaid

Family members engaged in financial abuse of the elderly may include spouses, siblings, children,  grandchildren or other relatives. They may engage in the activity because they feel justified, for instance, they are taking what they might later inherit or have a sense of "entitlement" due to a negative personal relationship with the older person, or that it is somehow the price of a promise of lifelong care. Or they may take money or property to prevent other family members from getting the money or for fear that their inheritance may be lost due to cost of treating illnesses. Sometimes, family members take money or property from their elders because of gambling or other financial problems or substance abuse.

Scams and fraud targeting seniors

Seniors are also often deliberately targeted by scams, fraud, and misleading marketing – often by otherwise legitimate businesses. This may include:
 fraudulent investment or insurance schemes
 fraudulent contracts (such as extended car or home warranties, which in reality cover nothing)
 unauthorized charges imposed by internet service providers
 worthless "sweepstakes" that elderly persons must pay in order to collect winnings
 fake pharmaceutical or diet/health products
 medical billing scams and unnecessary medical care
 predatory or unnecessary lending (e.g. reverse mortgages)
 Technical support scam and IRS impersonation scams, in which an elderly person may be cajoled or threatened into paying large sums of money in the form of bank transfers or gift cards
 charitable giving scams, including pressure to rewrite wills
 419 scams
 identity theft
 lottery scams
 tarmac scams
 Work-at-home scheme or other ways to generate income

A 1996 study by AARP found that while individuals over 50 comprised 35% of the American population, they accounted for 57% of all fraud victims (AARP, 1996). Seniors' level of vulnerability to this type of exploitation varies by the type of scam. For example, the AARP found that lottery fraud victims were more likely to be women over 70 living alone, with lower education, lower income, and less financial literacy, while victims of investment fraud were more likely to be men between the ages of 55 and 62 who were married, with higher incomes and greater financial literacy.

Hybrid financial exploitation

Hybrid Financial Exploitation (HFE) is financial exploitation that co-occurs with physical abuse and/or neglect. HFE victims are more likely to be co-habiting with abusive individual, to have fair/poor health, to fear the abusive individual, to perceive abusive individual as caretaker, and to have a longer duration of abuse.

Estimates of size and scope

Various attempts have been made to estimate the size and scope of the problem. The primary difficulties in estimating the size of the problem are:
 Differing descriptions of financial abuse – Victims often do not identify as having been a victim of fraud, so researchers generally offer respondents specific examples. The more specific the questions are, the more likely someone is to say they have experienced it – for example, surveys focused on identity theft, telemarketing, "gray charges," or investor fraud have found much higher rates than general surveys.
 Underreporting – Studies that rely on government databases or press reports are estimated to be off by factors ranging from five to forty, with 25 being a frequently cited number. Additionally, because of the stigma of victimhood caregivers are more likely to report that their parents have been victimized than the parents are to self-report as victims.
 Differences in survey methodology – Some surveys ask for losses in the last year, some ask about losses in the last five years, and some ask "have you ever experienced…", and surveys have variously defined seniors as aged 45+, 50+, 60+, and 65+.

Nonfinancial effects

Other effects include damage to credit, missing work, depression, and loss of sleep.

References

Abuse
Gerontology
Elder law